Durasovo is a rural locality (a selo) and the administrative centre of Durasovsky Selsoviet, Chishminsky District, Bashkortostan, Russia. The population was 368 as of 2010. There are 7 streets.

Geography 
Durasovo is located 23 km south of Chishmy (the district's administrative centre) by road. Verkhnekhozyaystvo is the nearest rural locality.

References 

Rural localities in Chishminsky District